Cortisone is a pregnene (21-carbon) steroid hormone. It is a naturally-occurring corticosteroid metabolite that is also used as a pharmaceutical prodrug; it is not synthesized in the adrenal glands. Cortisol is converted by the action of the enzyme corticosteroid 11-beta-dehydrogenase isozyme 2 into the inactive metabolite cortisone, particularly in the kidneys. Cortisone is converted back to the active steroid cortisol by the action of the enzyme 11β-Hydroxysteroid dehydrogenase type 1, particularly in the liver.

The term "cortisone" is frequently misused to mean either any corticosteroid or hydrocortisone, which is actually another name for cortisol. Many who speak of receiving a "cortisone shot" or taking "cortisone" are actually receiving hydrocortisone or one of many other, much more potent synthetic corticosteroids; it is unlikely that the drug administered is actually cortisone.

Cortisone can be administered as a prodrug, meaning it has to be converted by the body (specifically the liver, converting it into cortisol) after administration to be effective. It is used to treat a variety of ailments and can be administered intravenously, orally, intra-articularly (into a joint), or transcutaneously. Cortisone suppresses various elements of the immune system, thus reducing inflammation and attendant pain and swelling.  Risks exist, in particular in the long-term use of cortisone. However, using cortisone only results in very mild activity, and very often more potent steroids are used instead.

Effects and uses
Cortisone itself is inactive. It must be converted to cortisol by the action of 11β-hydroxysteroid dehydrogenase type 1. This primarily happens in the liver, the main site at which cortisone becomes cortisol after oral or systemic injection, and can thus have a pharmacological effect. After application to the skin or injection into a joint, local cells that express 11β-hydroxysteroid dehydrogenase type 1 instead convert it to active cortisol.

A cortisone injection may provide short-term pain relief and may reduce the swelling from inflammation of a joint, tendon, or bursa in, for example, the joints of the knee, elbow and shoulder and into a broken coccyx.

Cortisone is used by dermatologists to treat keloids, relieve the symptoms of eczema and atopic dermatitis, and stop the development of sarcoidosis.

Side effects
Oral use of cortisone has a number of potential systemic adverse effects, including asthma, hyperglycemia, insulin resistance, diabetes mellitus, osteoporosis, anxiety, depression, amenorrhoea, cataracts, glaucoma, Cushing's syndrome, increased risk of infections, and  impaired growth. With topical application, it can lead to thinning of the skin, impaired wound healing, increased skin pigmentation, tendon rupture, and skin infections (including abscesses).

History
Cortisone was first identified by the American chemists Edward Calvin Kendall and Harold L. Mason while researching at the Mayo Clinic. During the discovery process, cortisone was known as compound E (while cortisol was known as compound F).

In 1949, Philip S. Hench and colleagues discovered that large doses of injected cortisone were effective in the treatment of patients with severe rheumatoid arthritis. Kendall was awarded the 1950 Nobel Prize for Physiology or Medicine along with Philip Showalter Hench and Tadeusz Reichstein for the discovery of the structure and function of adrenal cortex hormones including cortisone. Both Reichstein and the team of O. Wintersteiner and J. Pfiffner had separately isolated the compound prior to the discovery made by Mason and Kendall, but failed to recognize its biological significance. Mason's contributions to the crystallization and characterization of the compound have generally been forgotten outside of the Mayo Clinic.

Cortisone was first produced commercially by Merck & Co. in 1948 or 1949. On September 30, 1949, Percy Julian announced an improvement in the process of producing cortisone from bile acids. This eliminated the need to use osmium tetroxide, a rare, expensive, and dangerous chemical. In the UK in the early 1950s, John Cornforth and Kenneth Callow at the National Institute for Medical Research collaborated with Glaxo to produce cortisone from hecogenin from sisal plants.

Production
Cortisone is one of several end-products of a process called steroidogenesis. This process starts with the synthesis of cholesterol, which then proceeds through a series of modifications in the adrenal gland to become any one of many steroid hormones. One end-product of this pathway is cortisol. For cortisol to be released from the adrenal gland, a cascade of signaling occurs. Corticotropin-releasing hormone released from the hypothalamus stimulates corticotrophs in the anterior pituitary to release ACTH, which relays the signal to the adrenal cortex. Here, the zona fasciculata and zona reticularis, in response to ACTH, secrete glucocorticoids, in particular cortisol. In various peripheral tissues, notably the kidneys, cortisol is inactivated to cortisone by the enzyme corticosteroid 11-beta-dehydrogenase isozyme 2. This is crucial because cortisol is a potent mineralocorticoid and would cause havoc with electrolyte levels (raising blood sodium and lowering blood potassium levels) and raise blood pressure if it were not inactivated in the kidneys.

Because cortisone must be converted to cortisol before being active as a glucocorticoid, its activity is less than simply administering cortisol directly (80–90%).

Popular culture
Addiction to cortisone was the subject of the 1956 motion picture Bigger Than Life, produced by and starring James Mason. Though it was a box-office flop upon its initial release, many modern critics hail the film as a masterpiece and brilliant indictment of contemporary attitudes toward mental illness and addiction. In 1963, Jean-Luc Godard named it one of the ten greatest American sound films ever made.

John F. Kennedy was regularly administered corticosteroids such as cortisone as a treatment for Addison's disease.

See also 
 
 
 Central serous retinopathy
 Corticosterol

Notes

Bibliography

 
 
 

Corticosteroids
Pregnanes
Prodrugs
Triketones